Yokangassi Airport  is an airport serving the town of Nkayi in Bouenza Department, Republic of the Congo.

See also

 List of airports in the Republic of the Congo
 Transport in the Republic of the Congo

References

External links
OpenStreetMap - Yokangassi
OurAirports - Yokangassi

Airports in the Republic of the Congo